is a railway station on the Iida Line in Tenryū-ku, Hamamatsu, Shizuoka Prefecture, Japan, operated by Central Japan Railway Company (JR Central).

Lines
Aizuki Station is served by the Iida Line and is 68.5 kilometers from the starting point of the line at Toyohashi Station.

Station layout
The station has one ground-level side platform serving a single bi-directional track, with a small wooden station building. The station is located in a valley between two tunnels. The station is not attended.

Adjacent stations

History
Aizuki Station opened on November 11, 1955. Along with its division and privatization of JNR on April 1, 1987, the station came under the control and operation of the Central Japan Railway Company.

Passenger statistics
In fiscal 2016, the station was used by an average of 7 passengers daily (boarding passengers only).

Surrounding area
The station is located in an isolated rural area.

See also
 List of railway stations in Japan

References

External links

 Iida Line station information 

}

Stations of Central Japan Railway Company
Iida Line
Railway stations in Japan opened in 1936
Railway stations in Shizuoka Prefecture
Railway stations in Hamamatsu